Theodore Gordon (1786–1845), was a Scottish inspector of army hospitals.

Life 
Gordon was born in Aberdeenshire, and studied arts and medicine at King's College, Aberdeen, and at the University of Edinburgh, at which latter he graduated with an MA in 1802. In 1803, when eighteen years of age, he was appointed assistant-surgeon in the army, and soon after joined the 91st Highlanders, accompanying the regiment to Germany in 1805. He saw service also in the Peninsula, and escaped shipwreck in the Douro (one of seven survivors) while in charge of invalids from Sir J. Moore's army.

He became surgeon to the 2nd battalion 89th regiment, and afterwards to the 4th regiment (King's Own), along with which he joined the Duke of Wellington in the Peninsula, was present at Salamanca, Vittoria, Badajoz, San Sebastian, and Burgos, and was promoted to the rank of staff-surgeon. Having been badly wounded in crossing the frontier into France, he was brought home and was invalided for a year. He resumed duty at Chelsea Hospital as staff-surgeon, had charge of a hospital at Brussels, after the Battle of Waterloo, and joined Wellington's staff in Paris, where he was promoted to be physician to the forces. After the peace he was chosen by Sir J. MacGrigor to be professional assistant at the medical board of the war office, and spent the remaining 30 years of his life in that administrative capacity. In 1836 he attained the rank of deputy-inspector-general of hospitals. He died in Brighton on 30 March 1845. In 1822 he married Miss Barclay, niece of Major-general Sir R. Barclay, K.C.B.

References

1786 births
1845 deaths
19th-century Scottish people
People from Aberdeenshire
Alumni of the University of Aberdeen
Alumni of the University of Edinburgh
Scottish surgeons
British Army regimental surgeons
British Army personnel of the Napoleonic Wars
19th-century Scottish medical doctors
Shipwreck survivors
Military personnel from Aberdeenshire